Dedication is an album by trombonists Robin Eubanks and Steve Turre which was recorded in 1989 and released on the JMT label.

Reception

The AllMusic review by Scott Yanow stated "Eubanks and Turre had worked together on and off for nearly four years at this point and their familiarity with each other's playing shows. Add to the two trombones a strong and flexible rhythm section and the result is a stimluating and varied set of modern jazz". The Chicago Tribune's Jack Fuller wrote "Robin Eubanks and Steve Turre are two of the best younger trombonists, but on this album their approach is surprisingly conservative".

Track listing
All compositions by Robin Eubanks except as indicated
 "The New Breed" - 6:22   
 "V.O." (Steve Turre) - 6:11   
 "Red, Black and Green Blues" - 6:33   
 "Trance Dance" (Steve Turre) - 6:43   
 "Perpetual Groove" - 5:03   
 "Especially for You" (Steve Turre) - 7:16   
 "Koncepts" (Steve Turre) - 5:02   
 "Victory" - 6:55

Personnel
Robin Eubanks - trombone, bass trombone, keyboards, bells
Steve Turre - trombone, sea shells, synthesizer, bells, claves
Mulgrew Miller - piano, synthesizers
Francesca Tanksley - synthesizer
Charnett Moffett - bass
Tommy Campbell, Tony Reedus - drums
Jimmy Delgado - congas, timbales

References 

1989 albums
Robin Eubanks albums
Steve Turre albums
JMT Records albums
Winter & Winter Records albums